Sergei Yuryevich Podoksyonov (born 29 July 1997) is a Russian football player. He plays for FC Irtysh Omsk.

Club career
He made his debut for FC Ural Yekaterinburg on 21 September 2016 in a Russian Cup game against FC Chelyabinsk.

He made his Russian Premier League debut for FC Ural Yekaterinburg on 25 September 2016 against FC Orenburg.

References

External links
 

1997 births
People from Irbit
Living people
Russian footballers
Association football midfielders
FC Ural Yekaterinburg players
FC Irtysh Omsk players
Russian Premier League players
Sportspeople from Sverdlovsk Oblast